Neuroligin-4, X-linked is a protein that in humans is encoded by the NLGN4X gene.

In the human brain, the synaptic protein NLGN4 is primarily expressed in the cerebral cortex.

This gene encodes a member of the neuroligin family of neuronal cell surface proteins. Neuroligins may act as splice site-specific ligands for beta-neurexins and may be involved in the formation and remodeling of central nervous system synapses. The encoded protein interacts with discs, large (Drosophila) homolog 4 (DLG4). Mutations in this gene have been associated with autism and Asperger syndrome. Two transcript variants encoding the same protein have been identified for this gene.

References

Further reading